Marc Spitz (October 2, 1969 – February 4, 2017) was an American music journalist, author and playwright. Spitz's writings on rock and roll and popular culture appeared in Spin (where he was a Senior Writer) as well as The New York Times, Maxim, Blender, Harp, Nylon and the New York Post. He was a contributing music writer for Vanity Fair.

Biography
Born in Far Rockaway, Queens, Spitz was the author of the novels How Soon Is Never and Too Much, Too Late, and the biographies We Got the Neutron Bomb: The Untold Story of LA Punk (with Brendan Mullen), Nobody Likes You: Inside the Turbulent Life, Times and Music of Green Day, Bowie: A Biography, and Jagger: Rebel, Rock Star, Rambler, Rogue. He appears in the anthologies The Encyclopedia of Ex-es, Howl: A Collection of the Best Contemporary Dog Wit, and Rock N’ Roll Cage Match: Music’s Greatest Rivalries Decided. His books have been translated and published in French, Danish, German, and Dutch.

Spitz was a "Downtown" playwright, emerging from the Ludlow Street scene around Todo Con Nada in 1998. His other theatrical work includes Retail Sluts, The Rise and Fall of the Farewell Drugs, ...Worry, Baby, The Hobo Got Too High, I Wanna Be Adored, Shyness Is Nice, Gravity Always Wins, The Name of This Play is Talking Heads, Your Face Is A Mess, A Marshmallow World, Up For Anything, and P.S. It's Poison. Shyness Is Nice was selected and anthologized as one of NY Theatre's Best Plays of 2001, and its opening monologue appears in the Applause anthology One on One: Best Men’s Monologues of the 21st Century, published in October, 2008.

Spitz spoke at Columbia University (on playwrighting) and DePaul University (on journalism), and appeared as a "talking head" on MTV, VH1, MSNBC.

Spitz died in New York City, at the age of 47.

Books

Novels

Nonfiction

Plays
 Retail Sluts
 The Rise and Fall of the Farewell Drugs
 "…Worry, Baby"
 The Hobo Got Too High
 I Wanna Be Adored
 Shyness Is Nice
 Gravity Always Wins
 The Name of This Play is Talking Heads
 Your Face Is A Mess
 A Marshmallow World
 Up For Anything
 P.S. It's Poison
 Revenge and Guilt

References

External links
 Marc Spitz at Vanity Fair
 Marc Spitz at Random House

1969 births
2017 deaths
American humorists
American male journalists
20th-century American dramatists and playwrights
American music critics
American music journalists
21st-century American novelists
American male novelists
Writers from New York City
21st-century American biographers
American male dramatists and playwrights
20th-century American male writers
21st-century American male writers
Novelists from New York (state)
20th-century American non-fiction writers
American male biographers
Bennington College alumni